Newfund is a venture capital firm focused on early stage investment in France and the United States. Founded in 2008, it had raised more than 230 million euros as of September 2018, mostly from entrepreneurs, business leaders, and family offices. It typically invests between €500,000 and €2m per company. It has repeatedly been listed among the most significant venture capital funds in France.

Investments

Newfund's geographical scope of investment is in France and the United States, including a dedicated fund in the Nouvelle-Aquitaine Region and the Basque Country initiated in December 2018. Its sectoral scope has included web-enabled services, health technology, financial technology, and since 2021, neuroscience and mental health.

Notable companies in which Newfund is an investor include Aircall, a cloud-based phone services provider; Red Luxury, a Paris-based designer of fashion watches and jewelry; and FairMoney, a prominent digital bank in Nigeria.

Notable exits have included Medtech, a robotic surgery company that developed the ROSA robot, listed on Euronext Paris from November 2013, and purchased in July 2016 by Zimmer Biomet; Luckey Homes, a Paris-based concierge services company, purchased in December 2018 by Airbnb; Beyond Ratings, an ESMA-registered credit rating agency, purchased in June 2019 by London Stock Exchange Group; Eqinov, an energy efficiency services provider, purchased in February 2022 by Acciona Energy; Tageos, a designer and manufacturer of RFID labels, purchased in March 2022 by Fedrigoni; and In2Bones, a medical device designer and manufacturer, purchased in June 2022 by Conmed Corporation.

Team

François Véron, a former board member of trade body AFIC (renamed France Invest in January 2018),  created Newfund in 2008.

See also
 Iris Capital

References

External links
Website

Venture capital firms of France